Ingerthorpe is a hamlet and former civil parish about  from Harrogate, now in the parish of Markington with Wallerthwaite, in the Harrogate district, in the county of North Yorkshire, England. In 1931 the parish had a population of 64.

History 
The name "Ingerthorpe" means 'Ingrid's outlying farm/settlement'. Earthworks that are purported to be Ingerthorpe medieval village are visible on historic air photos, however they have been listed as rejected or doubtful. Ingerthorpe is not in the Domesday Book and wasn't mentioned before the late 12th century. Ingerthorpe was formerly a township in the parish of Ripon, from 1866 Ingerthorpe was a civil parish in its own right until it was abolished and merged with Markington with Wallerthwaite on 1 April 1937.

References 

Hamlets in North Yorkshire
Former civil parishes in North Yorkshire
Borough of Harrogate